Events from the year 1704 in art.

Events

Works
 Paolo Alessandro Maffei – Engraving of Menelaus supporting the body of Patroclus
 Sebastiano Ricci
 Crucifixion with Virgin, John the Evangelist and Carlo Borromeo (Uffizi, Florence)
 Procolo, Peasant Detention (Bergamo Cathedral)

Births
 January 17 (bapt.) – William Verelst, English painter of portraits, still lifes and birds (died 1752)
 January 24 – Francesco Appiani, Italian painter of the late-Baroque period, active mainly in Rome and Perugia (died 1792)
 February 15 – Jean-Baptiste Lemoyne, French sculptor (died 1778)
 April 4 – Andreas Brünniche, Danish portrait painter (died 1769)
 May/June – Johann Baptist Straub – German Rococo sculptor (died 1784)
 August 2 – Robert Gillow, English furniture designer (died 1772)
 September 5 – Maurice Quentin de La Tour, French Rococo portraitist working primarily in pastels (died 1788)
 date unknown
 Isaac Basire, English engraver and head of family of engravers (died 1768)
 Gaetano Lapis, Italian painter of the late-Baroque period (died 1776)
 Pierre L'Enfant, French painter (died 1787)
 Johann Georg Platzer, Austrian painter of primarily historical and mythical scenes (died 1761)
 1704/1705: Jan Jerzy Plersch, Polish sculptor of German origin (died 1774)

Deaths
 February 3 – Antonio Molinari, Venetian painter of mythology and religious figures (born 1655)
 August – Francis Barlow, British painter, etcher, and illustrator (born 1626)
 October 1 – Cornelis Dusart, Dutch  genre  painter, draftsman, and printmaker (born 1660)
 date unknown
 Carlo Bolognini, Italian painter of quadratura (born 1678)
 Matias de Arteaga, Spanish painter and engraver (born 1630)
 Alonso del Arco, Spanish painter (born 1635)
 Egbert van Heemskerck, Dutch painter, also known as Egbert van Heemskerck the Elder (born 1634)
 Filippo Gherardi, Italian painter of frescoes (born 1643)
 Giovanni Marracci, Italian painter (born 1637)
 Cosimo Ulivelli, Italian who painted frescoes for the Santissima Annunziata church (born 1625)

 
Years of the 18th century in art
1700s in art